Chubineh may refer to:
 Chubineh, Kermanshah
 Chubineh, Qazvin